is an album compiling all the indie recordings by the Japanese girl group Momoiro Clover. The album was released on June 5, 2013 on SDR (Stardust Records).

Track listing

Charts

References

External links 
 "Iriguchi no Nai Deguchi" special site - Stardust Records
 Album profile on the official site
 

Momoiro Clover Z albums
2013 greatest hits albums